Lee DuMonde is a fictional character from Days of Our Lives portrayed by Brenda Benet from 1979 to 1982. The character was written out after Benet's suicide in 1982.

Storylines
Lee is a gold digger and she came to Salem when her boyfriend Byron Carmichael died and left his fortune to his half-brother Doug Williams. Lee married Doug and kept him from his true love Julie Olson. After she had a stroke her sister Renée DuMonde came to town. Lee couldn't save her marriage to Doug and he divorced her. Renée began dating Tony DiMera and Lee warned her to stay away from him. When Renée read her diary she found out that Lee wasn't her sister but her mother and that her father was Stefano DiMera. Now that Tony was her brother she married someone else, but then Daphne DiMera revealed that Tony wasn't really Stefano's son. Renée resented Lee for lying to her and she couldn't bear that and left town.

External links
Lee at soapcentral.com

Days of Our Lives characters
Television characters introduced in 1979
Fictional psychiatrists
Female characters in television